Achilles and Briseis is a picture depicting tableaux from the Iliad relating to the gifting of Briseis to Achilles found in the House of the Tragic Poet Pompeii, Italy.  The image is painted in distemper, similar to coloured white-washing and intermediary between fresco and paint. It was at one time moved to the Naples National Archaeological Museum.  

Agostino Carracci produced an engraving from it, which was included in his collection of erotic poses, I Modi.

References
Wheeler, William A., and Charles G. Wheeler. Familiar Allusions A Handbook of Miscellaneous Information. Boston and New York: Houghton, Mifflin, and Company The Riverside Press, Cambridge, 1881. Print.

Pompeii (ancient city)
Roman Empire paintings
Ancient Roman erotic art
Paintings based on the Iliad
Ancient Roman paintings